My Sister Sadie is a 2003 play by British playwright Alan Ayckbourn. It was billed as a "family" play, and shown as the Stephen Joseph Theatre's Christmas production. It is about a seventeen-year-old boy who finds, emerging from a helicopter crash, a mysterious female who calls herself "Sadie", with an uncanny resemblance to his dead sister, with a military platoon in hot pursuit of a missing deadly weapon.

References

External links
 My Sister Sadie on official Ayckbourn site

2003 plays
Plays by Alan Ayckbourn
Science fiction theatre